Sporting News Player of the Year Award refers to a set of awards given to the player of the year in various sports as adjudged by Sporting News:

Awards include:

Sporting News College Football Player of the Year, beginning in 1942
Sporting News Men's College Basketball Player of the Year, beginning in 1942
The Sporting News Minor League Player of the Year Award, minor league baseball from 1936 to 2007
Sporting News MLB Player of the Year Award, Major League Baseball beginning in 1936
Sporting News NFL Player of the Year Award, National Football League beginning in 1954